Joanna M. Nunan (born October 3, 1965) is a United States Maritime Service vice admiral, and a retired United States Coast Guard rear admiral, who has served as the 14th superintendent of the United States Merchant Marine Academy since December 8, 2022. The first woman to become superintendent of the Academy, her appointment was lauded by secretary of transportation Pete Buttigieg and administrator of the United States Maritime Administration Ann C. Phillips.

A native of Bridgeport, Connecticut, Nunan served in the Coast Guard from 1987 to 2022, eventually retiring in 2022 as the deputy for personnel readiness to the deputy commandant for mission support. She also served as assistant commandant for human resources from July 2019 to July 2021, commander of the Ninth Coast Guard District from August 2017 to June 2019, and commander of Coast Guard Sector Honolulu from August 2010 to May 2013.

A graduate of the United States Coast Guard Academy and Rensselaer Polytechnic Institute, Nunan also has multiple Merchant Marine licenses.

Notes

References

1965 births

Living people
Female admirals of the United States Coast Guard
United States Merchant Marine Academy superintendents
United States Coast Guard Academy alumni
Rensselaer Polytechnic Institute alumni
Recipients of the Coast Guard Distinguished Service Medal
Recipients of the Legion of Merit
Legionnaires of the Legion of Merit
Military personnel from Washington, D.C.
Military personnel from Bridgeport, Connecticut